Mahidhara Nalinimohan (4 August 1933 – 23 October 2005) was an Indian space scientist and writer from Andhra Pradesh. He wrote many articles on popular science in Telugu. His father Mahidhara Rammohan Rao was a noted novelist, journalist and freedom fighter.

Early life 
He was born on 4 August 1933 in Munganda, East Godavari district of Andhra Pradesh in a patriotic family. His father Mahidhara Rammohan Rao was a noted novelist, journalist and freedom fighter. Having grown up in a house of literary movement, he began writing poetry at the age of 15 years. He later turned to be a science writer. He completed his masters in Physics from Osmania University in 1955 and got his Ph.D from Moscow university in 1963.

Career 
After carrying out research in countries like Sweden, Bulgaria, he came to India and joined National Physical Laboratory in New Delhi. He took part in launching 16 satellites. He carried out research on atmospheric changes in the upper ionosphere in the capacity of deputy director of the Laboratory.

Awards 
 Kavi Kokila Duvvuri Ramireddy Vignana Bahumati
 Indira Gandhi Vignana Bahumati

Death 
Nalini Mohan died on 23 October 2005 in an old-age home in Hyderabad. He was survived by his son and three daughters.

References 

People from East Godavari district
Indian space scientists
1933 births
2005 deaths
Journalists from Andhra Pradesh
Scientists from Andhra Pradesh
20th-century Indian essayists
Indian popular science writers